Blåberg is a mountain on the west side of the village of Øvre Årdal in Årdal Municipality in Vestland county, Norway. It is a well-known tourist hiking spot and it is also known for its copper mines. It was sometimes called the mine mountain.

Blåberg was the site of copper mining starting in the 18th century when rich sources of copper were found, and mining began on the mountain and surrounding valleys around the Årdalsfjorden which is part of the Sognefjord.

Media gallery

References

External links
 The Årdal Copper Mines, Årdal, Sogn og Fjordane, Norway

Årdal
Mountains of Vestland